XEPR-AM and XHPR-FM in Poza Rica, Veracruz is an AM/FM combo radio station broadcasting on 1020 kHz and 102.7 MHz.

History

XEPR began broadcasting on March 17, 1953. The original studios featured a mural by Teodoro Cano García depicting the history of oil. The station was granted an FM combo frequency in 1994.

In February 2021, Éxtasis Digital moved to XHCOV-FM 105.9 as a result of the announced sale of XHPR-FM and XHPW-FM by Grupo Radiorama to Marcos López Zamora, the owner of XHRIC-FM 101.9, who immediately took over operation of both frequencies.

On March 21, weeks after the purchase, MVS Radio's FM Globo romantic format started.

References

Radio stations in Veracruz